Louis Conrad Pelletier,  (November 10, 1852 – June 5, 1929) was a Quebec lawyer and political figure. He represented Laprairie in the House of Commons of Canada from 1891 to 1896 as a Conservative member.

Biography 
He was born in Lavaltrie, Canada East, the son of Emile Pelletier and Emilie Laporte. He was educated at the Collège de l'Assomption and McGill University. Pelletier was admitted to the Quebec bar in 1877 and set up practice in Montreal. He ran unsuccessfully for the La Prairie seat in the Quebec assembly in 1890 and again in 1900. He was elected to the House of Commons in the 1891 federal election and was defeated by Dominique Monet when he ran for reelection in the newly created riding of Laprairie—Napierville in 1896. Pelletier was named Queen's Counsel in 1893.

In 1894, he married Marie-Anne Élisabeth Élisa Bernardette Roberge. Pelletier served as mayor for La Prairie in 1904. He was also co-founder of the St. Lawrence Brick company (Briqueterie Saint-Laurent). Pelletier was bâtonnier for the Montreal bar from 1920 to 1921.

Louis-Siméon Morin, a cousin on his father's side, served as a member of the legislative assembly for the Province of Canada.

Louis Conrad Pelletier died at his home in Montreal on June 5, 1929.

References 
 
 The Canadian parliamentary companion, 1891, AJ Gemmill

1852 births
1929 deaths
Members of the House of Commons of Canada from Quebec
Conservative Party of Canada (1867–1942) MPs
Mayors of places in Quebec
People from Lanaudière
Canadian King's Counsel
McGill University alumni